Asanasio Maraka was an Anglican bishop in Uganda.

Maraka was ordained deacon in 1946 and priest in 1948. He served with the CMS from 1946 to 1951; and in the Anglican Diocese of Kumi from 1952 to 1960; and in Soroti from 1960 to 1963. He was archdeacon of Teso from 1963 to 1965 when he was consecrated the bishop of Soroti.

References

20th-century Anglican bishops in Uganda
Anglican bishops of Soroti
Anglican archdeacons in Africa